Togoville is a town and canton in southern Togo. It lies on the northern shore of Lake Togo. It was originally known as Togo. Like the country, the town is named after the lake.

History 
Gustav Nachtigal signed a treaty with the town's chief, Mlapa III, in 1884, from which Germany claimed dominion over what became Togo.

After 17 years of regency, Togoville's sixth king Mlapa was elevated. He spent 18 years in education. Inducted on July 7, 2018, his name is Fiogan Joel Kwassi Mensah Mlapa VI.

Culture
Togoville Cathedral was built-in 1910, including a shrine to the Virgin Mary to mark where she is said to have appeared  on November 7, in the early 1970s. This area is a centre for the practice of voodoo and voodoo shrines are present near the former royal palace. Nearby is a sacred forest.

West of the church is the Maison Royale, a small museum that houses Mlapa's throne and various historic relics and photographs. In June 1984, a monument commemorating the 100th anniversary of the treaty was erected.

Education 
Three main high schools are located in the town, College Notre Dame Du Lac of Togoville, College Saint Augustin and College d'Enseignement General of Togoville. Students come from across Togo and Africa to attend school there.

References

Populated places in Maritime Region
Cantons of Togo